Wendy Ruth Sherman (born June 7, 1949) is an American diplomat who is serving as the United States Deputy Secretary of State since April 2021. She was a professor of the practice of public leadership and director of the Center for Public Leadership at the Harvard Kennedy School, a senior counselor at Albright Stonebridge Group, and a senior fellow at Harvard Kennedy School's Belfer Center for Science and International Affairs.

Sherman, a social worker, served as the director of EMILY's list, the director of Maryland's office of child welfare, and the founding president of the Fannie Mae Foundation. During the Clinton administration, she served as Counselor of the United States Department of State from 1997 to 2001. She was also a Special Advisor to President Bill Clinton and Secretary of State Madeleine Albright and North Korea Policy Coordinator. In the latter role, she was instrumental in negotiations related to North Korea's nuclear weapon and ballistic missile programs. 

Sherman served under Hillary Clinton and John Kerry as Under Secretary of State for Political Affairs from 2011 to 2015. She was the fourth-ranking official in the U.S. Department of State. In that role, Sherman was the lead negotiator for the Iran nuclear deal. After winning the 2020 presidential election, Joe Biden nominated Sherman to serve as United States Deputy Secretary of State, under Antony Blinken.

Early life and education
Sherman was born in Baltimore, Maryland, to a Jewish family. Her father, Malcolm Sherman, a veteran of the U.S. Marines, was originally from Philadelphia. While she was in elementary school, her family moved to Pikesville, Maryland, and Sherman attended Pikesville High School. Sherman attended Smith College from 1967 to 1969, and graduated from Boston University in 1971 in the field of sociology and urban studies. In 1976, she earned a master's degree in social work from the University of Maryland.

Career

Early career

Sherman, a social worker, began her career working to help women who had been abused and people in poverty. She credits her skills in negotiations to her social work experience and education saying: “For me that core set of skills was in community organizing and clinical skills and I only half joke that those clinical skills have been very effective with both dictators and members of congress… it does help to understand interpersonal relations and how people think and feel and have different sets of interests.”

As part of the neighborhood movement, she worked as a social activist, alongside activists like Geno Baroni and Arthur Naparstek on problems related to low-income housing.

Sherman's early jobs were in partisan politics and social work. These included working as the director of EMILY's List, which provides money to pro-choice, female, Democratic political candidates. She also worked as director of Maryland's office of child welfare and as the president and CEO of the Fannie Mae Foundation, an arm of Fannie Mae.

North Korea nuclear negotiations
Wendy Sherman was the Clinton administration's policy coordinator for North Korea. The Clinton Administration had first arrived at the 1994 Agreed Framework under which North Korea agreed to freeze and dismantle its nuclear weapons program, including its main reactor at Yongbyon (Sherman continues to defend the 1994 deal and her involvement in it, stating that "during the Clinton administration not one ounce of plutonium was added to the North Korean stockpile"). Sherman later headed North Korean negotiation policy until 2001. In 2001, following years of secret negotiations with Kim Jong Il, North Korea had promised not to produce, test or deploy missiles with a range of more than 300 miles. That offer would prevent North Korea from fielding missiles that could strike the United States. North Korea also offered to halt the sale of missiles, missile components, technology and training.

In 2001, in a New York Times op-ed, Sherman recommended that the only way the US deal could deal with North Korea's disputed programs and prevent them achieving a nuclear capability was through diplomacy, writing that Kim Jong Il now "appears ready to make landmark commitments".

In 1999, James Baker criticized her team's negotiating strategy with North Korea as "appeasement" – that was rewarding the North Korean regime for minimal concessions, and he said that as a result they would fail to prevent their nuclear program. In 2011, John Bolton said that Wendy Sherman had been central in forming a policy on North Korea that was "nothing less than appeasement."

Private sector, political, think-tank career
She has been a Vice Chair of Albright Stonebridge Group, Albright's international strategic consulting firm, since the group's formation in 2009. She advised Hillary Clinton during the 2008 presidential campaign, and she has served with Thomas Donilon as an agency review lead for the State Department in the Obama presidential transition.

In 2015 she was named as one of The Forward 50.

Sherman also sits on the Atlantic Council's Board of Directors.

Fannie Mae
From April 1996, Sherman became founding President and CEO of the newly created Fannie Mae Foundation, which was developed by Fannie Mae and endowed with $350 million in Fannie stock, with the goal of promoting home ownership and mortgages across wider sectors of American society. She has also been a member of the operating committee of Fannie Mae. At Fannie Mae, she set in place the groundwork for the newly recreated foundation.

In 1996, she described her mission as the first president of the Fannie Mae Foundation:

Under Secretary of State for Political Affairs (2011–2015)

On September 21, 2011, she was appointed to the position of Under Secretary of State for Political Affairs by Secretary Hillary Clinton. In this capacity, Sherman has led the US team during six negotiating rounds between Iran and six world powers about Tehran's nuclear program.

In this position, she was the fourth-highest ranking member of the Department.

She was named part of a special task force by Secretary of State Hillary Clinton to implement recommendations to improve protections for foreign service personnel, as a result of the 2012 Benghazi attack.

Sherman was critical of Benjamin Netanyahu's step back from a two-state solution, suggesting it could impact the United States' veto policy surrounding related resolutions at the United Nations.

She was criticized by human rights organizations, including Amnesty International for praising Ethiopia for "strengthening its democracy" in wake of the 2015 elections - citing democratic backsliding and suppression of human rights.

She played a role in negotiating the details behind the Syria peace talks of 2016.

Chief nuclear negotiator with Iran

In October 2013, before negotiations began in Geneva between Iran and the so-called "P5+1," she made a comment about the Iranian negotiating strategy in a Senate committee hearing. She said, "We know that deception is part of the DNA." This caused her some trouble when a number of Iranian officials, including some members of the country's parliament, asked her to apologize.
She served as the lead negotiator for the United States in the agreement reached with Iran on July 14, 2015, in Vienna.

Remarks on East Asia
On February 27, 2015, Sherman told a conference at Carnegie Endowment for International Peace "The Koreans and Chinese have quarreled with Tokyo over so-called comfort women from World War II. There are disagreements about the content of history books and even the names given to various bodies of water. All this is understandable, but it can also be frustrating." She continued, "Of course, nationalist feelings can still be exploited, and it's not hard for a political leader anywhere to earn cheap applause by vilifying a former enemy. But such provocations produce paralysis, not progress." Her comments were condemned by South Korea, but an analyst at the Asan Institute for Policy Studies said the reaction to Ms. Sherman's remarks seemed excessive, and that her comments were in line with US policy.

Deputy Secretary of State (2021–present)

On January 16, 2021, President-elect Joe Biden formally announced Sherman to serve as United States Deputy Secretary of State under Antony Blinken. On March 11, 2021, her nomination was reported out of the Senate Foreign Relations Committee. Her nomination was approved by the full Senate on April 13, 2021, by a vote of 56 to 42. She is the first woman to hold the position. She was sworn in to office on April 14, 2021.

Personal life
Sherman is married to Bruce Stokes, a former journalist and Director, Global Economic Attitudes at the Pew Research Center. They first met in 1978 for a discussion about low-income housing. They have one daughter.

Selected works
She is the author of Not for the Faint of Heart: Lessons in Courage, Power and Persistence published by PublicAffairs, September 2018.

References

External links

Official biography at the U.S. Department of State

|-

|-

|-

|-

1949 births
Living people
21st-century American women
20th-century American Jews
American women diplomats
American diplomats
Biden administration personnel
Boston University College of Arts and Sciences alumni
Clinton administration personnel
MSNBC people
Obama administration personnel
United States Deputy Secretaries of State
Under Secretaries of State for Political Affairs
United States Assistant Secretaries of State
Washington, D.C., Democrats
21st-century American Jews
Women academics